"Perfect Game" is the third single released by the Thompson Twins and the first taken from their debut album, A Product Of... (Participation). It was released in January 1981 on the T Records imprint, a label created by the band and distributed through the Fame/EMI label. The B-side to the single is the single mix of "Politics".

Formats
7" UK vinyl single (TEE1)
Side A
"Perfect Game" (Single Edit) - 3:41
Side B
"Politics" (Single Mix) - 2:37

Personnel 
Written by Tom Bailey, Chris Bell, Peter Dodd, John Roog

Produced by Mike Howlett
Recorded at the Town House
Engineer - Steve Dewey
Design by T.T.

References

1981 singles
Thompson Twins songs
Songs written by Tom Bailey (musician)
Song recordings produced by Mike Howlett
1981 songs